The City of Dunedin by-election 1897 was a by-election held in the multi-member  electorate during the 13th New Zealand Parliament, on 13 October 1897.

Background
The by-election was caused by the death of incumbent MP Henry Fish and was won by Alexander Sligo. On nomination day (5 October) Alexander Sligo, Hugh Gourley and William Hutchison were the nominated candidates. Sligo contested the election as the Conservative candidate whilst Gourley and Hutchinson both stood in Liberal interests. Alexander Sligo was subsequently elected the following week.

Results
The following table gives the election results:

Notes

References

Dunedin 1897
1897 elections in New Zealand
1890s in Dunedin
Politics of Dunedin